Bae Gi-ung (born 7 June 1974) is a South Korean boxer. He competed in the men's bantamweight event at the 1996 Summer Olympics.

References

1974 births
Living people
South Korean male boxers
Olympic boxers of North Korea
Boxers at the 1996 Summer Olympics
Place of birth missing (living people)
Boxers at the 1998 Asian Games
Asian Games competitors for South Korea
Bantamweight boxers
20th-century South Korean people